Jack Jenkins (born 26 November 2001) is an English professional footballer who plays as a midfielder for  club Salford City, on loan from  club Leeds United.

Career
After playing for Garforth Villa at youth level, and coming through Leeds United's academy, Jenkins signed a two-year scholarship with the club in April 2018. Jenkins signed his first professional contract on 15 January 2019, with the contract lasting until the summer of 2021. He signed a new contract in November 2019, lasting until summer 2023. He played for Leeds United U21's against Barrow in the EFL Trophy on 5 October 2020. He was first named on the Leeds bench on 7 November 2020 for a fixture against Crystal Palace. Jenkins made his senior Leeds debut on 10 January 2021 in the 3–0 FA Cup third round defeat against Crawley Town as a half-time substitute.

Style of play
Jenkins is right-footed. He typically plays as a box-to-box midfielder. He can also play as a defensive midfielder.

Career statistics

References

External links
 

English footballers
Living people
Association football midfielders
Leeds United F.C. players
Salford City F.C. players
English Football League players
2001 births